Helmuth Wilberg (1 June 1880 – 20 November 1941) was a German officer of Jewish ancestry and a Luftwaffe General of the Air Force during the Second World War.

Military career

Wilberg joined the 80. Fusilier Regiment "von Gersdorff" (Kurhessisches) on 18 April 1899. He was promoted to Leutnant (lieutenant) on 27 January 1900. Starting in 1906, he worked as an instructor at the cadet schools at Naumburg and Lichterfelde. On 18 October 1909 he was promoted to Oberleutnant (senior lieutenant).

In 1911, he wrote the paper, "Aerial Reconnaissance in Kaisermanöver 1911:  Its value and influence on leadership compared with the cavalry reconnaissance". In 1913, he enlisted in the Luftstreitkräfte (Imperial German Air Force), and was one of Germany's first military pilots. When war broke out he was a Hauptmann (captain) and commanding officer of 11. Feldfliegerabteilung (Field Aviation Battalion). He later served as Kommandeur der Flieger (commander of aviation, Kofl) of Fourth Army.

After the war, he was transferred to the Reichswehr. He served there until 1927, when he transferred to the Ministry of Defense; he also served with the Truppenamt, and finally as head of Luftschutzreferats.

He later joined the 18th Infantry Regiment as a battalion commander, with the rank of Oberstleutnant (lieutenant colonel). From 1929 to 1932, he commanded the Breslau vicinity, being appointed Generalmajor (major general). He headed the Reichswehr air staff for eight years in the 1920s.

Hermann Göring, in command of the Luftwaffe, considered making Wilberg Chief of Staff. However, it was revealed Wilberg had a Jewish mother. Not wishing his talent to go to waste, Göring had him reclassified as being "Aryan" and Wilberg remained in the air staff, helping draw up its principal doctrine, "The Conduct of the Aerial War", and its "Regulation 16" under Walther Wever.

In subsequent years, he worked secretly on rebuilding the Luftwaffe, which he joined in 1934. Wilberg was initially a department head in the Reichsluftfahrtministerium (Ministry of Aviation, RLM). In 1935, he took over the construction of the air war school in Werder an der Havel, and later the Higher Air Force School in Berlin.

Wilberg significantly influenced German air war doctrine. In 1937, he created "Special Staff W", responsible for collecting and analyzing the tactical lessons learned by the Legion Kondor during the Spanish Civil War. In March 1938, he was promoted General der Flieger. In the mobilization prior of the 1939 Invasion of Poland, Wilberg was reactivated and used as head of aviation training command.

On 20 November 1941, he was killed in a plane crash near Dresden, on his way to the funeral of Ernst Udet.

Awards
Royal Order of the Crown IV. Class
Iron Cross (1914) II. and I. Class
Knight's Cross of the Royal House Order of Hohenzollern with Swords
Bavarian Military Merit medal IV. Class with Swords
Mecklenburg Military Merit Cross II. Class
Mecklenburg Cross for distinction in war II. Class
Prussian pilot's reminder badge
Austrian Military Merit Cross III. Class with war decoration
Gallipoli Star Ottoman War Medal
Knight's Cross IV. Class II. Stage of the Bulgarian Military Order for bravery
Wehrmacht Long Service Award IV. to I. Class

References
Notes

Bibliography
 Corum, James (1997) The Luftwaffe: Creating the Operational Air War, 1918–1940. Lawrence, Kansas: University Press of Kansas 
 Hooton, E. R. (2010) The Luftwaffe: A Study in Air Power, 1933–1945. London: Classic Publications 
 Rigg, Bryan Mark (2002) Hitler's Jewish Soldiers (Modern War Studies series) Lawrence, Kansas: University of Kansas Press

External links 
 Helmut Wilberg at Fliegergrab.de

1880 births
1941 deaths
Military personnel from Berlin
German people of Jewish descent
Generals of Aviators
Luftstreitkräfte personnel
Luftwaffe World War II generals
Aviators killed in aviation accidents or incidents in Germany
Victims of aviation accidents or incidents in 1941
Prussian Army personnel
Luftwaffe pilots